was a Japanese samurai of the late Edo period who became an officer in the Imperial Japanese Army.

Background
He was a samurai of the Satsuma Domain, and an associate of Saigō Takamori. Beppu joined Saigō's forces during the Satsuma Rebellion. At the end of the rebellion in September 24, 1877, it was Beppu who was the second at Saigō's seppuku. After Saigō's death, Beppu and the other ex-samurais charged against the ranks of the attacking Imperial Japanese Army forces, and were killed.

References

1847 births
1877 deaths
Meiji Restoration
Samurai
People of the Boshin War
Deaths by firearm in Japan
Japanese warriors killed in battle
Military personnel from Kagoshima Prefecture
People from Satsuma Domain
People of Meiji-period Japan
Shimazu retainers